Mark Lapidus (born 27 December 1995) is an Estonian chess player who won the Estonian Chess Championship in 2012.

Chess career
Mark Lapidus won the Estonian Junior Chess Championships (U16) in 2009 and 2011. From 2004 he participated in the European Junior Chess Championships and the World Junior Chess Championships in different age groups. He won an IM norm at the World Junior Championship (2012).

In the Estonian Chess Championship Mark Lapidus has won gold medal (2012).

Mark Lapidus played for Estonia in Chess Olympiads:
 In 2012, at second board in the 40th Chess Olympiad in Istanbul (+2, =2, -4).

References

External links
 
 
 

1995 births
Living people
Estonian chess players
Chess Olympiad competitors
Sportspeople from Tallinn